Filmmaker Fernando Fragata started his career in Portugal with the short film Love & Alchemy, which won him several International awards for best short film and best director. His other Portuguese films include the romantic comedy Sweet Nightmare and the critically acclaimed action comedy Chasing Life (Pulsação Zero). In 2004 he wrote and directed the mystery crime The Trunk (Sorte Nula), which became the top grossing Portuguese film of that year. Backlight came in 2010 and again broke box office records in his home country.

Filmography 

 Backlight
 Sorte Nula
 Sweet Nightmare
 Pulsação Zero
 Love & Alchemy
 Jornalouco

References

External links 
 
 Fernando Fragata's official website

Living people
Year of birth missing (living people)
Place of birth missing (living people)
Portuguese film directors